Torchwood: Original Television Soundtrack is a soundtrack album which was released on 22 September 2008, containing incidental music composed by Ben Foster and Murray Gold and used in the first and second series of the British science fiction television programme Torchwood.

Ahead of the official release, the album became available for download on the American iTunes Store on 5 August 2008, and on the Silva Screen website on 8 August 2008.

Track listing

References

Soundtrack
Television soundtracks
2008 soundtrack albums
Silva Screen Records soundtracks